Jake Hsu (born December 30, 1990) is a Taiwanese actor.

Hsu is best known for starring in Close Your Eyes Before It's Dark (2016), the fourth installment in the anthology series Qseries, as well as Trapped (2019), the first chapter of the web series HIStory3.

Early life 
Hsu was born on December 30, 1990, in Taoyuan, Taiwan. During high school, he was the president of the magic club and was able to solve Rubik Cube in 30 seconds. Because of colleagues' reactions to his performances, he fell in love with performing arts, and despite his parents' and teachers' opposition he decided to study art. He attended and graduated from National Taiwan University of Arts, earning a bachelor's degree in drama. During this time, he engaged in many school productions and theatrical performances.

In 2015, Hsu auditioned for Q Place, a project founded by eight award-winning directors and designed for cultivating new actors and actresses. Out of approximately four hundred contestants, Hsu came to be one of the twenty-four actors and actresses that qualified for the subsequent actor training class and the opportunity to be cast in installments of the anthology series Qseries.

Hsu can play Guitar and Piano and is known for being a huge movie fan, watching ten to fifteen movies every week, actively going to film festivals, and correctly predicting many of the Oscars award winners. Hsu is also known for his support of gender equality, environmental causes and had a lifeguard license.

Career

2015–2016: Acting debut 

In 2015, Hsu made a cameo appearance in the drama Youth Power as Ah Bao, playing a student from a wealthy family.

In 2016, Hsu starred as a supporting character Heng Li in Love of Sandstorm, the first installment in Qseries, and a non-credited character Xiao Kuo in Life Plan A and B, the following installment in Qseries that also stars Rainie Yang. Hsu's lead role Li Zi-shuo in Close Your Eyes Before It's Dark as a homosexual who holds unrequited affection for his close friend gained him recognition and popularity among fans.

2017–present: Rising popularity 

In 2017, Hsu was cast as a lead role Xu Xiao-fan in 1000 Walls in Dream, playing the brother who suffers from a bipolar disorder of protagonist Xu Xiao-qing (Christina Mok).

In 2018, Hsu starred as a supporting cast Wu Cheng-han in Age of Rebellion, a high school dropout with artistic talents. During the same year, Hsu also played the lead role as a blind man Xu Qiang in My Goddess, who is able to move people with his singing, alongside Jasper Liu, Annie Chen, and Nana Lee.

In 2019, Hsu was cast as Meng Shao-fei in Trapped, the first installment in the third season of HIStory. He plays a police officer intent on uncovering the truth behind the death of his superior while developing romantic affection for the gang leader Tang Yi (Chris Wu). Trapped was a hit both domestically and internationally, and Hsu was able to attract fans worldwide. At the 56th Golden Horse Awards Ceremony, Hsu served as a Golden Horse Awards ambassador along with Wang Ko-yuan and PinEr Chen.

In 2020, Hsu challenged hosting his own show on the Radio Broadcasting Platform "Wave"  and starred in his agency's self-produced online reality show Action Together along with his label mates Fu Meng-po, Nick Yang and OuYang Lun. He also starred as Chen Shun-he in Zihuatanejo, a marine biologist along with Patty Lee. Before filming for the drama he obtained OWD diving certificate and later also obtained AOWD certificate.

Filmography

Feature film

Series

Short film

Music video appearances

Reality Show

Theater

Stage play

Discography

Featured Songs

Awards and nominations

References

External links
 
 
 
 

1990 births
Living people
21st-century Taiwanese male actors
Taiwanese male film actors
Taiwanese male television actors
Male actors from Taoyuan City
National Taiwan University of Arts alumni